The Star is a weekly newspaper published in Port St. Joe, Florida.  It was owned by Freedom Communications until 2012, when Freedom's Florida and North Carolina papers were sold to Halifax Media.

References

External links

 
 Official mobile site
 Freedom Communications subsidiary profile of The Star

Newspapers published in Florida
Gulf County, Florida
Freedom Communications